Hathersage is a civil parish in the Derbyshire Dales district of Derbyshire, England. The parish contains 54 listed buildings that are recorded in the National Heritage List for England. Of these, one is listed at Grade I, the highest of the three grades, three are at Grade II*, the middle grade, and the others are at Grade II, the lowest grade.  The parish, which is almost entirely rural, contains the village of Hathersage and the surrounding countryside.  Most of the listed buildings are farmhouses and farm buildings, houses, cottages, and associated structures.  The other listed buildings include two churches, a cross shaft in a churchyard, a presbytery and a vicarage, two bridges, former mills, a milepost, a former toll house, a railway viaduct, and a lamp column.


Key

Buildings

References

Citations

Sources

 

Lists of listed buildings in Derbyshire